is a dance and vocal girl group created by MORADO COMPANY. Consisting of girls of elementary and junior high school students in Japan. It is used as the activity aimed at community interaction and contribution to the slogan "Tohoku sources unit".

History 
It was formed in March 2006. The CD debut on May 5, 2007. Other local television appearances, each member also performs work CM, drama, such as model events and appearances around the country. Members have a clean-up activities around my studio in lessons before.

SPLASH raised big awareness in Miyagi Prefecture, appeared in the 40th anniversary of CM "Miyagi TV" started broadcasting in 2010. Was working as a main character named "SPLASH Week" is viewership week of spring, who played co-sponsored game of the Tohoku Rakuten Golden Eagles, which was held in Kleenex Stadium Miyagi as "Miyatele support team (ミヤテレ応援隊)" continue "Miyateleday (ミヤテレデー)" etc. in 2011.

The activity and renewal as "Tohoku sources unit SPLASH2012" the unit name from May 2012. In some cases to carry out activities in the organization provisional plus four members of JEWEL from June 2013. In "economic development projects in the area ”Nationwide campaign Amachan map! You" in conjunction TV series of NHK as "Amachan (あまちゃん)" in August, and was elected to the PR Miyagi Prefecture "local supporters" from August 2013.

Member

Past members

SPLASH Jr. 
The SPLASH Jr., At the bottom of the organization SPLASH, back up dancers on stage along with the SPLASH at the time of the event. It has been a juvenile from members of SPLASH, not only women, men are also included. The divided "Jr. First" and "Jr. Second" member recruitment to SPLASH is also performed. Original song called "Christmas song Jr." Also have. December 16, 2007 to (at music studio MOX), I made live event only SPLASH Jr..

Discography

Singles

See also 
Ai-Girls
Nogizaka46

References

External links
MORADO COMPANY Official website - production company 
MAKE A SPLASH -  Official blog 
SPLASH Official Profile 
AMI 高橋 亜実 
SAYAKA  
KOTOMI 山﨑 琴美 
MAKI 早坂 真紀 
KIRARA 橋本 きらら 
MOKA 萌香 

Japanese girl groups
Japanese idol groups
Japanese pop music groups
Japanese-language singers
Musical groups established in 2006
Musical groups from Miyagi Prefecture